Dale "Hank" Henry (born September 24, 1964) is a Canadian former professional ice hockey forward who played 132 games in the National Hockey League for the New York Islanders.

Henry was born in Prince Albert, Saskatchewan, and has been married to his wife, Rebecca Henry, since 1996.

Career statistics

External links
 

1964 births
Living people
Canadian ice hockey forwards
Saskatoon Blades players
Sportspeople from Prince Albert, Saskatchewan
Springfield Indians players
New York Islanders draft picks
New York Islanders players
Ice hockey people from Saskatchewan
Muskegon Lumberjacks players
Oklahoma Coyotes players
Albany Choppers players
Milwaukee Admirals (IHL) players
San Antonio Iguanas players
Bossier-Shreveport Mudbugs players